Scatopse notata  is a species of fly in the family Scatopsidae. It is found in the  Palearctic .

References

External links
 Images representing Scatopsidae at BOLD
Bioimages 12 images of Scatopse notata

Scatopsidae
Flies described in 1758
Nematoceran flies of Europe
Taxa named by Carl Linnaeus